Several ships of the Royal Navy have borne the name HMS Growler

 , a  launched in 1797 and captured by French privateers on 21 December 1797. The French Navy took her into service under her existing name. The Royal Navy recovered her in a decayed state in 1809.
 , a gun-brig launched in 1804 and sold in 1815
 , a sloop, broken up January 1854 at Portsmouth.
 , an  screw gunboat. broken up 14 December 1864 at Malta.
 , a rescue tug. Later RFA Growler

Citations

Royal Navy ship names